Favor Peak is a mountain in the eastern part of Mitkof Island, one of the islands in the Alexander Archipelago in Alaska. It is just northeast of Blaquiere Point and southwest of the Dry Strait.

References 

Mountains of Alaska
Mitkof Island
Mountains of Petersburg Borough, Alaska
Alexander Archipelago